Felipe Ríos (born 4 March 1992) is a Chilean tennis player.

Ríos has a career high ATP singles ranking of 738 achieved on 6 May 2013. He also has a career high ATP doubles ranking of 733 achieved on 29 April 2013.

Ríos made his ATP main draw debut at the 2011 Movistar Open, by receiving a wildcard in the singles draw facing Rui Machado.

References

External links
 
 

1992 births
Living people
Chilean male tennis players
Sportspeople from Viña del Mar
Competitors at the 2010 South American Games